The Heinkel HeS 011 or Heinkel-Hirth 109-011 (HeS - Heinkel Strahltriebwerke) was an advanced World War II jet engine built by Heinkel-Hirth. It featured a unique compressor arrangement, starting with a low-compression impeller in the intake, followed by a "diagonal" stage similar to a centrifugal compressor, and then a three-stage axial compressor. Many of the German jet-powered aircraft designs at the end of the war were designed to use the HeS 011, but the HeS 011 engine was not ready for production before the war ended in Europe and only small numbers of prototypes were produced.

Design and development
Starting in 1936, Junkers started a jet engine development project under the direction of Wagner and Müller, who worked on axial compressor designs. By 1940 they had progressed to the point of having a semi-working prototype, which could not run under its own power and required an external supply of compressed air.

Meanwhile, Hans Mauch, in charge of engine development at the RLM, decided that all engine development should take place at existing engine companies. In keeping with this new policy, he forced Junkers to divest itself of their internal engine teams. Müller and half of the existing Junkers team decamped and were happily accepted by Ernst Heinkel, who had started German jet development when he set up a lab for Hans von Ohain in 1937. The two teams worked on their designs in parallel for some time, von Ohain's as the HeS 8 (or 109-001), and the Junkers team as the HeS 30 (109-006). Heinkel's efforts were later re-organized at Hirth Motoren.

Helmut Schelp, who had taken over from Mauch, felt that the BMW 003 and Junkers Jumo 004 would reach production at about the same power levels long before either of the Heinkel projects would be ready, and cancelled both of them. He outlined a new development plan with three engine classes; the 003 and 004 were "Class 1" engines of under 1000 kg thrust suitable for small fighters, but only really useful in twin-engine designs. Schelp was much more interested developing a "Class II" engine of 1000–2000 kg, larger designs able to power a full-sized fighter design with a single engine. Schelp was also interested in seeing one of his own pet projects, the diagonal compressor, adopted. Schelp had earlier convinced Heinkel to put some effort into another pet project of his, a twin-compressor single-turbine turboprop, but had given up on this and instead offered Heinkel his new concept as a consolation prize.

In some ways, the HeS 011 can be considered a combination of the two teams' designs, a three-stage axial compressor from Müller's team, combined with a single-stage centrifugal compressor from von Ohain's, the two driven by a single two-stage turbine. The 011 shared two features with the Jumo 004, with an engine-mounted Riedel two-stroke engine functioning as an APU to get the central shaft turning during engine startup, but mounted above the intake orifice within a Heinkel-crafted prefabricated sheet-metal intake passage instead of inside the intake diverter as the 004 had done, and also had a variable geometry exhaust nozzle, with a restrictive body of differing aerodynamic shape to the 004's Zwiebel (onion) unit, that likewise traveled fore and aft in the nozzle to vary the thrust. Plans were also made for a turboprop version, the HeS 021, but the workload at Heinkel was so high that this project was later given to Daimler-Benz to complete.

Prototypes were available in 1944, and tested using a Heinkel He 111 bomber, mounting the engine on the external hardpoints under the fuselage. Over the next year, practically all German aircraft designers based their projects on the 011, very much as had been done only a year or two previously with projected piston-engined designs, such as those of the twin-engined Bomber B program, widely based on the equally experimental Junkers Jumo 222 twenty-four cylinder powerplant. Advanced high-output (>1,500 kW) aviation piston engines and more advanced turbojets proved to be something the German aviation engine industry would have considerable challenges developing into combat-reliable engines throughout the war years. As a result, and like the nearly three hundred experimental examples built of the complex Jumo 222 piston engine, the HeS 011 turbojet never entered production, with only 19 prototypes built in total. One of these was mounted in the Messerschmitt Me P.1101 that was taken to the United States, forming the basis of the Bell X-5.

In all, only nineteen HeS 011s were completed. Two museum-preserved examples survive in the United States:  one at the National Museum of the U.S. Air Force in Dayton, Ohio, and one at the EAA Aviation Museum in Oshkosh, Wisconsin. The Spanish INI patented in 1951 a similar design (ES197663 ), on exhibition at Cuatro Vientos Air Museum in Madrid.

Variants
109-011 V1Initial prototype, delivering 10.9 kN (2459 lbf) thrust at 9920 RPM
109-011 A-0Pre-production variant, intended to provide 12.7 kN (2866.5 lbf) at 11000 RPM
109-011 BImproved variant, intended to provide 14.7 kN (3307 lbf) thrust, not built.
109-011 CImproved variant to provide 16.7 kN (3748 lbf) thrust, not built.
109-021Planned turboprop derivative (subcontracted to Daimler-Benz) to provide 2,427 kw (3300 hp); intended for Focke Wulf Fw 281, not built.

Applications
Aircraft designs intended to be powered by the HeS 011:

 Arado Ar 234D
 Arado E.555/II long-range bomber
 Blohm & Voss P 212 tailless jet fighter
 Focke-Wulf Flitzer jet fighter
 Focke-Wulf Ta 183 Huckebein
 Heinkel He 162B & -C versions
 Heinkel He 343 jet medium bomber
 Heinkel P.1078 jet fighter
 Heinkel P.1079 twin-jet, 2-seat all-weather/night fighter
 Henschel Hs 132C prone-pilot seating fighter-bomber
 Horten H.XVIII jet strategic bomber (as one option)
 Junkers EF 128 tailless jet fighter (twin vertical fins at mid-wing position)
 Messerschmitt P.1101
 Messerschmitt P.1106
 Messerschmitt P.1110 (both canard/Ente and conventional versions)

Specifications (109-011 A-0)

See also

References

Notes

Bibliography

 

 Radinger, Willy & Schick, Walter, Secret Messerschmitt Projects, Schiffer Publishing, 1996,

External links

Photo of the HeS 011 at the EAA Airventure Museum, by Gary Brossett (missing forward intake components and Riedel APU unit)

Centrifugal-flow turbojet engines
Heinkel aircraft engines
1940s turbojet engines